Calbuco is a stratovolcano in southern Chile, located southeast of Llanquihue Lake and northwest of Chapo Lake, in the Los Lagos Region, and close to the cities of Puerto Varas and Puerto Montt. With an elevation of 2,015 meters above sea level, the volcano and the surrounding area are protected within the Llanquihue National Reserve.

The most recent eruption, a major VEI 4 event, happened with little warning on April 22–23, 2015, followed by a smaller eruption on April 30. This was Calbuco's first activity since 1972.

Name and location
Calbuco is located partly in  Puerto Varas Commune and partly in  Puerto Montt Commune. It lies 49 km from the city of Puerto Varas and 69 km from Puerto Montt. Its name is thought to come from the Mapuche words "kallfü" (blue) and "ko" (water), meaning "blue water". It shares the name with Calbuco Island in nearby Reloncaví Sound as well as the city and commune of Calbuco, although it is not located there.

Geology
Calbuco is a very explosive andesite volcano whose lavas usually contain 55 to 60% silicon dioxide (SiO2). It is elongated in a SW-NE direction and is capped by a 400-500 meter wide summit crater. Its complex evolution included the collapse of an intermediate edifice during the late Pleistocene that produced a debris avalanche that reached Llanquihue Lake.

Volcanic activity

Calbuco has had 36 confirmed eruptions during the Holocene, 13 of which have been recorded in historical times. 20th century eruptions took place in 1906, 1907, 1909, 1911, 1917, 1929, 1932, 1945, 1961, and 1972. A series of three eruptions occurred from April 22–30, 2015.

The 1893–95 Calbuco eruption was one of the largest ever to take place in southern Chile, with debris ejected to distances of eight kilometres, accompanied by voluminous hot lahars. The 1893 eruption disrupted the daily life of German settlers in eastern Llanquihue Lake. In this area potato fields, cattle and apiculture was negatively impacted. Cattle were evacuated from the area and settlers lobbied the government of Jorge Montt to be relocated elsewhere.

In the strong explosions of April 1917, a lava dome formed in the crater accompanied by hot lahars. Another short explosive eruption in January 1929 also included an apparent pyroclastic flow and a lava flow.

The major eruption of 1961 sent ash columns 12–15 km high, produced plumes that dispersed mainly to the south east and emitted two lava flows. There was a minor, four-hour eruption on August 26, 1972. Strong fumarolic emission from the main crater was observed on August 12, 1996.

The most recent eruption happened in April 2015, when on April 22, the volcano suddenly erupted with little warning, sending a large ash column into the atmosphere; another eruption occurred in the early hours of April 23. A smaller eruption occurred on April 30. The eruptions ranked as a 4 on the Volcanic Explosivity Index. The volcano returned to the lowest alert level on August 18, 2015. The ash of the eruption dispersed nutrients into the sea which may have contributed to unleashing the algal bloom of 2016.

See also
List of volcanoes in Chile
List of Ultras of South America

Gallery

References

Sources

External links

 "Volcán Calbuco, Chile" on Peakbagger
 Roja: Declina actividad del volcán Calbuco tras segunda erupción on Sernageomin 
 Se mantiene monitoreo permanente al volcán Calbuco on Onemi 
 Calbuco volcano description with photo gallery of its historical eruptions  
 Analysis of precursory activity of the 2015 eruption  
 First studies with results of the 2015 eruption 

Videos 2015 Eruption
 Video Calbuco Volcano Erupts by National Geographic 2015-04-23 
 Video Timelapse Calbuco Chile 2015-04-22 on YouTube

Stratovolcanoes of Chile
Volcanoes of Los Lagos Region
Calbuco
Mountains of Los Lagos Region
South Volcanic Zone
21st-century volcanic events
VEI-5 volcanoes